The Adriaan Reins Altarpiece is a three-panel 1480 altarpiece, painted by Hans Memling for brother Adriaan Reins of the Old St. John's Hospital in Bruges. It still hangs there as part of the collection of the Memlingmuseum.

Sources
 Ilse E. Friesen, The Female Crucifix: Images of St. Wilgefortis Since the Middle Ages, Wilfrid Laurier Univ. Press, 2006 p. 55
  Irene Smets, Ludiongids Het Memlingmuseum-Sint-Janshospitaal Brugge, Ludion Gent-Amsterdam, 2001 pp. 64-68

1480 paintings
Paintings by Hans Memling
Paintings in the Old St. John's Hospital
Paintings depicting the Passion of Jesus
Paintings of the Virgin Mary